Vasant Prabhu (19 January 1924– 13 October 1968) was a music composer from Maharashtra who was a prolific composer of nonfilm Marathi songs known as 'bhaav-geete', and also worked in Marathi film industry. He is known for his collaboration with singer Lata Mangeshkar for composing various songs of films which she sang. Prabhu also partnered with lyricist P. Savlaram on various films. Prabhu was also a choreographer.

Biography
Vasant Prabhu acted in a few films under National Studios banner around 1939 as a child artiste, under the name Master Vasant. In the film Comrades (1939), he was one of the voices in the chorus and on the screen for the song 'wo chamak chamak kar taare' under the music direction of Anil Biswas.

Prabhu was a trained dancer having learned Katthak in his childhood. Along with dance, he also had basic knowledge of music and beats. He tried his luck in grabbing in a role as an actor in Marathi films which were then produced in Pune and Kolhapur. He finally got a break when HMV signed him for the Marathi film Ram Ram Paavhna where he composed few songs and also choreographed them. He also composed music for the film Vaadal which was produced under the banner "Surel Chitra" by Lata Mangeshkar. Lata herself sang several songs in the film. Prabhu choreographed actress Sulochana Latkar for the film Taaraka directed by Dinkar D. Patil.

Prabhu went on to pair with Mangeshkar and lyricist P. Swalaram in various further projects, notable being the film Kanyadaan. He also was composer of the songs "Ghat Doiwar, Ghat Kamrewar", "Jo Aawdto Sarwana" and "Aali Hasat Pahili Raat" penned by Sawlaram which became popular. For another film Bhairavi of Dinkar Patil, Prabhu's songs were sung by Pandit Firoz Dastur and Dashrath Pujari. For the film Putra Vhava Aisa, Talat Mahmood sang two songs for the first time in Marathi. Mahmood was popular for his ghazals in Hindi cinema. Vasant Prabhu composed music for one Hindi film named Gharbaar in 1953.

Prabhu's biography in Marathi has been written by Madhu Potdar and published by Manjul Prakashan under the name "Manasicha Chitrakaar To", which is also a song he composed. In October 2008, Soham Pratishthan and Anubodh organized a show "Swarprabhu - Vasant Prabhu" in his memory at Vile Parle, Mumbai.

Discography

References

Further reading
 Manasicha Chitrakaar To, Madhu Potdar, Manjul Prakashan

External links 
 
 http://www.musicindiaonline.com/music/marathi/s/artist.653/type.13/
 http://smriti.com/hindi-songs/name-vasant-prabhu
 Discography at http://Aathavanitli-gani.com

Indian film score composers
Year of birth uncertain
1968 deaths
1922 births
20th-century composers